In Greek mythology, Peristera is a nymph who was transformed into a dove, one of Aphrodite's sacred birds and symbols, explaining the bird's connection to the goddess.

Mythology 
One day Aphrodite and her son Eros arrived in a bright meadow, and for fun they held a contest on which could gather the most flowers. Eros, bearing swift wings, easily outdid his mother, until Peristera stepped in and handed to Aphrodite the flowers she herself had picked, giving Aphrodite the victory. Eros, in anger over his victory being snatched away from his hands, transformed Peristera into the bird bearing her name, the dove. Accordingly, the dove came under Aphrodite's protection thereafter. This myth survives in the works of the first of the three anonymous Vatican Mythographers, whose works were discovered in a single manuscript in 1401.

See also 

 Alcyone and Ceyx
 Antigone of Troy
 Atalanta and Hippomenes

References

Bibliography 
 
 

Deeds of Eros
Deeds of Aphrodite
Metamorphoses into birds in Greek mythology
Nymphs